Kasey Evering (born 14 February 1983) is a Jamaican international netball player. Evering is primarily a defender at international level, although she also plays as a shooter in domestic competition.

Evering made her debut with the Jamaica national netball team, the Sunshine Girls, in 2000 against England. That year she also competed at the World Youth Netball Championships in Wales. During her international career, Evering has won bronze medals with the Sunshine Girls at two Netball World Championships (2003 and 2007), and has competed at two Commonwealth Games (in 2006 and 2010), where Jamaica placed fourth both times.

Evering left the national team after the 2007 World Championships, following an injury and a dispute with the Jamaican Netball Association. She continued to play domestic netball with Tivoli Gardens, whom she had played with since 2001. Evering suffered a potentially career-ending knee injury during a league match in 2009. After a long recovery involving two surgeries, Evering returned the following year to help guide Tivoli to a Berger Super League title.

Evering returned to the national team that year in time for the 2010 Commonwealth Games in Delhi, and played in the January 2011 test series against Australia. In 2011, Evering made her debut in the Australasian ANZ Championship, signing with New Zealand franchise the Canterbury Tactix. She injured the anterior cruciate ligament in her left knee during a regular season match, ending her season with the Tactix and ruling her out of the 2011 Netball World Championships in Singapore. She once again rejoined the team in 2014 and was selected for the 2014 Commonwealth Games where the team won bronze. As of 2014, she has over 70 caps for her country.

References

Jamaican netball players
Netball players at the 2006 Commonwealth Games
Netball players at the 2010 Commonwealth Games
Mainland Tactix players
1983 births
Living people
ANZ Championship players
Commonwealth Games bronze medallists for Jamaica
Netball players at the 2014 Commonwealth Games
Commonwealth Games medallists in netball
Jamaican expatriate netball people in New Zealand
2003 World Netball Championships players
2007 World Netball Championships players
Medallists at the 2014 Commonwealth Games